Colle Brianza is a comune (municipality) in the Province of Lecco in the Italian region Lombardy, located about  northeast of Milan and about  southwest of Lecco.

Colle Brianza borders the following municipalities: Airuno, Castello di Brianza, Dolzago, Ello, Galbiate, Olgiate Molgora, Santa Maria Hoè, Valgreghentino.

References

External links
 Official website

Cities and towns in Lombardy